"Dedicato" is an Italian R&B ballad written by Ivano Fossati and performed by  Loredana Bertè. It was the first Bertè's single entering the top ten on the Italian hit parade.

Fossati recorded the song in his album La mia banda suona rock. Bertè and Fossati recorded a Spanish version of the song titled "Dedicado". Bertè also recorded an English version of the song titled "Dedicating". The song was adapted in French with the title "Dédié à toi" and performed by Dalida. In 2013, a new version was included by Gianna Nannini in her cover album Hitalia.

Track listing
7" single –  CGD 10117
 "Dedicato" – 4:35 (Ivano Fossati) 
 "Amico giorno" – 3:27 (Mario Lavezzi, Oscar Avogadro, Daniele Pace)

Charts

References

 

1978 singles
1978 songs
Loredana Bertè songs
Songs written by Ivano Fossati
Compagnia Generale del Disco singles